Melese is a genus of moths in the family Erebidae. The genus was erected by Francis Walker in 1854.

Species

Melese albogrisea Rothschild, 1909
Melese amastris (Druce, 1884)
Melese aprepia Dognin, 1908
Melese asana (Druce, 1884)
Melese babosa (Dognin, 1894)
Melese barbuti Vincent, 2004
Melese binotata (Walker, 1856)
Melese castrena Schaus, 1905
Melese chiriquensis Schaus, 1905
Melese chozeba (Druce, 1884)
Melese columbiana Rothschild, 1909
Melese costimacula Joicey & Talbot, 1916
Melese dorothea (Stoll, [1782])
Melese drucei Rothschild, 1909
Melese endopyra Hampson, 1901
Melese erythrastis Dognin, 1907
Melese farri Murphy & Garraway, 2007
Melese flavescens Joicey & Talbot, 1918
Melese flavimaculata Dognin, 1899
Melese hampsoni Rothschild, 1909
Melese hebetis Rothschild, 1909
Melese incertus (Walker, 1855)
Melese inconspicua Rothschild, 1909
Melese innocua Dognin, 1911
Melese intensa Rothschild, 1910
Melese klagesi Rothschild, 1909
Melese laodamia (Druce, 1884)
Melese lateritius (Möschler, 1878)
Melese leucanioides (Herrich-Schäffer, [1856])
Melese levequei Vincent, 2004
Melese monima Schaus, 1910
Melese nebulosa Joicey & Talbot, 1916
Melese nigromaculata Rothschild, 1909
Melese ocellata Hampson, 1901
Melese paranensis Dognin, 1911
Melese peruviana Rothschild, 1909
Melese postica Walker, 1854
Melese pumila Dognin, 1908
Melese punctata Rothschild, 1909
Melese pusilla Rothschild, 1909
Melese quadrina Schaus, 1910
Melese quadripunctata Rothschild, 1909
Melese rubricata Dognin, 1910
Melese russatus (H. Edwards, 1884)
Melese signata Joicey & Talbot, 1916
Melese sixola Schaus, 1910
Melese sordida Rothschild, 1909
Melese sotrema Schaus, 1920
Melese underwoodi (Rothschild, 1917)

Former species
Melese niger Toulgoët, 1983

References

 
Phaegopterina
Moth genera